Libenge Airport  is an airport serving the Ubangi River town of Libenge in the Sud-Ubangi Province of the Democratic Republic of the Congo. The Ubangi is locally the border with the Central African Republic.

The runway has an additional  cleared ground overrun on the southern end.

The  Libenge non-directional beacon (Ident: LIB) is located on the airfield.

See also

 Transport in the Democratic Republic of the Congo
 List of airports in the Democratic Republic of the Congo

References

External links
 OurAirports - Libenge
 FallingRain - Libenge Airport
 OpenStreetMap - Libenge

Airports in Sud-Ubangi